INS Ajay was the first warship built in Independent India and the namesake of the s. She was built by the Hooghly Dock and Port Engineers (Now Garden Reach Shipbuilders and Engineers) and was delivered to the Indian Navy on 21 September 1960.

In July 1974 the Indian Navy gave her to the Bangladesh Navy.

See also 
 List of historic ships of the Bangladesh Navy

References 

Ships of the Bangladesh Navy
Patrol vessels of the Bangladesh Navy
Ships built in Kolkata
Patrol vessels of the Indian Navy